Malta adopted a new telephone numbering plan in 2001–2002, in which telephone numbers were expanded to eight digits for fixed line and mobile numbers. Previously, fixed line numbers were six digits, while mobile, mailbox and pager services were seven digits long.

Geographic numbering
The prefix 21 was added to GO fixed line numbers.

          xx xxxx (before 2002, from within Malta)
       21xx xxxx (after 2002, from within Malta)
  +356 21xx xxxx (after 2002, outside Malta)

Melita fixed line numbers have the prefix 27.

Numbers were generally assigned according to locality:
22: Valletta, Ħamrun, Marsa
23: Floriana, Ħamrun
24: Pietà, Malta
25: Marsa
32: Gżira
33: Tas-Sliema, Msida
34: Gżira, Msida
37: San Ġiljan, Pembroke, San Ġwann
38: San Ġwann
41: Attard, Għargħur, Iklin, Lija, Mosta, Naxxar
42: Lija, Mosta
44: Qormi, Balzan, Birkirkara
45: Dingli, Mdina, Mtarfa, Rabat, Malta
46: Żebbuġ, Malta
48: Qormi, Birkirkara
49: Qormi
52: Mellieħa, Mġarr
55: Gozo
56: Gozo
57: San Pawl il-Baħar
63: Marsaskala
64: Qrendi, Safi, Zurrieq, Kirkop
65: Birżebbuġa, Marsaxlokk
66: Żejtun, Vittoriosa, Bormla, Fgura, Għaxaq, Senglea, Kalkara, Luqa, Paola
67: Marsaxlokk, Gudja
68: Kirkop, Mqabba, Qrendi, Safi
69: Bormla
80: Żabbar, Vittoriosa, Fgura

Non-geographic numbering

The prefix 9 for seven-digit Epic mobile phone numbers was changed to 99.

          9xx xxxx (before 2002, from within Malta)
       99xx xxxx (after 2002, from within Malta)
  +356 99xx xxxx (after 2002, outside Malta)
The prefix 09 for Vodafone mobile phone numbers was changed to 99.

Mobile phone numbers with the prefix 09, which were already eight digits, changed to 99. The digit 0 was to be dialled from outside Malta as well as domestically.

          09xx xxxx (before 2002, from within Malta)
       99xx xxxx (after 2002, from within Malta)
  +356 09xx xxxx (before 2002, outside Malta)
  +356 99xx xxxx (after 2002, outside Malta)

Other non-geographic number ranges also changed, with the prefix for seven-digit mailbox numbers changing from 07 to 217.

          07x xxxx (before 2002, from within Malta)
       217x xxxx (after 2002, from within Malta)
     +356 07x xxxx (before 2002, outside Malta)
     +356 217x xxxx (after 2002, outside Malta)

Similarly, the prefix for pager numbers changed from 70 and 71 to 7117

          70x xxxx (before 2002, from within Malta)
       7117 xxxx (after 2002, from within Malta)
  +356 7117 xxxx (after 2002, outside Malta)
The prefix for Go Mobile is 79
       79xx xxxx (after 2002, from within Malta)
  +356 79xx xxxx (after 2002, outside Malta)

References

Malta
Telecommunications in Malta
Malta communications-related lists